Rosemary Jane Boyton is a British immunologist who is Head of Lung Immunology and Adult Infectious Disease at Imperial College London. She works on the molecular immunology of infectious, allergic and autoimmune inflammation. She holds an honorary consultant position at the Royal Brompton Hospital, where she specialises in lung infection.

Early life and education 
Boyton trained in medicine at the Royal Free London NHS Foundation Trust and gained a Bachelor of Medicine, Bachelor of Surgery (MB BS) degree. She served as a junior doctor in various London hospitals, including the Royal Brompton Hospital, Guy's Hospital and the Hammersmith Hospital. After training in respiratory medicine, infectious diseases and general medicine, Boyton was awarded a Wellcome Trust research fellowship to complete a PhD at Imperial College London where she studied the mechanisms that underpin T helper cell responses.

Research and career 
After earning her doctoral degree, Boyton completed her specialist training at St Mary's Hospital and the Royal Free Hospital. She was awarded a Medical Research Council fellowship to develop novel models of lung inflammation. Boyton established the Imperial College London Lung Immunology Group, where she studies respiratory infection and asthma. In allergic asthma, lung inflammation is caused by a CD4 T cell that attacks otherwise harmless allergens. This attack can trigger an immune reaction which damages bodily tissue. Boyton has studied how the body responds to pollen, in an effort to improve treatment for people who suffer from hayfever. She showed that it was peptide 26 in the pollen that is most regularly recognised by the immune system. In 2016 she was awarded a Medical Research Council (MRC) grant to investigate correlates of immunity to Zika virus.

During the COVID-19 pandemic, Boyton studied the requirements for countries to move out of lockdown. As of late April 2020, around one third of the world's population was under lockdown. Boyton explained that to begin to reopen countries, there should be investment in increased testing, immune status return-to-work permits and contact tracing. She has claimed that countries that which reopen ignore the fact that outbreaks amongst low-risk individuals can still cause a pandemic. Boyton emphasised that there would be a need for more accurate and specific antibody tests, which could identify asymptomatic SARS-CoV-2 sufferers who have recovered from the disease, and seroprevalence data. In the case of Severe Acute Respiratory Syndrome, 90% of survivors had virus-neutralising antibodies, and around half had strong T-lymphocyte responses. Boyton believes that policy should be guided by data and evidence rather than assumptions about herd immunity. Her research has been funded by the Medical Research Council (MRC) and Biotechnology and Biological Sciences Research Council (BBSRC).

Selected publications

References 

Living people
Year of birth missing (living people)
Women immunologists
Academics of Imperial College London
Alumni of Imperial College London
British women medical doctors